Hold time may refer to:

 In digital electronics, the minimum amount of time the data input should be held steady after the clock event for reliable sampling; see Flip-flop (electronics)#Timing considerations 
 The amount of time spent in a phone queue on hold (telephone)
 Hold Time (album), by M. Ward

See also
 Holding time (disambiguation)